Nicole Rieu (born 16 May 1949, Chaumont, Haute-Marne) is a French singer, best known outside France for her participation in the 1975 Eurovision Song Contest.

Rieu signed her first record contract with AZ Records in 1969. In 1973 she was spotted by the larger Barclay label, where she was offered a deal, and scored a hit with her first release "Je suis". In 1975, Rieu was chosen internally by channel TF1 as the French representative for the 20th Eurovision Song Contest with the Pierre Delanoë-penned song "Et bonjour à toi l'artiste". The contest was held on 22 March in Stockholm, and Rieu finished in fourth place of 19 entrants.

Rieu followed her Eurovision appearance with further successful singles such as "Je m'envole" and "En courant" (a French-language version of Diana Ross' "Theme from Mahogany") in 1976, "L'immigrant" (1977) and "La goutte d'eau" (1979). She took a career break of several years in the 1980s in order to concentrate on raising her son, since when she has continued to tour and release albums at sporadic intervals.

References

External links 
 
 Discography and cover art

1949 births
Living people
People from Chaumont, Haute-Marne
French women singers
Eurovision Song Contest entrants for France
Eurovision Song Contest entrants of 1975